The International Union for Theoretical and Applied Mechanics (IUTAM) is an affiliation of about 500 mechanicians in about 50 countries, and involving about 20 associated organizations, including the International Council for Science (ICSU).  The proceedings of symposia organized by IUTAM are published as Procedia IUTAM.

The IUTAM was organized in 1946 at the sixth International Congress of Applied Mechanics in Paris. The ICAM first met in 1924 at Delft, Netherlands, under the guidance of Jan Burgers, with 214 participants from 21 countries.
The Delft congress was the first in a series of International Congresses of Applied Mechanics. The second was held in 1926 in Zurich. Afterwards these congresses were convened in four-year intervals: 1930 in Stockholm, 1934 in Cambridge, England, 1938 in Cambridge, USA.  After the Second World War the tradition of these conferences was resumed under the umbrella of an official organization, the International Union for Theoretical and Applied Mechanics (IUTAM).
The spirit of international cooperation was initiated by Theodore and Josephine de Karman, natives of Hungary that worked in Germany before going to Caltech. In fact, the "zeroth" International Congress of Mechanics was organized for 1922 to discuss hydrodynamics and aerodynamics:
I managed to get together with Dr. Tullio Levi-Civita, a distinguished mathematician from the University of Rome, and we decided to call the first international conference on mechanics. We issued invitations to the French, British and Americans to meet with their former enemies, the Germans, Austrians and Hungarians, in Innsbruck, Austria. My sister and I paid the secretarial expenses out of our own pocket.
Revival of internationalism after Hitler was described as follows:
[In 1946] we revived the International Congress of Applied Mechanics, which I had helped to create after World War I and which served as a forum for my scientific contest with Prandtl. In 1938, when the members voted to suspend further meetings, we also voted that if world conditions ever changed for the better, we would hold the next meeting in Paris. So eight years and a world war later we kept our word. The meeting was a great success in bringing together representatives of all nations. It was here that we formalized the congress into the International Union for Theoretical and Applied Mechanics (IUTAM).

IUTAM awards the Batchelor Prize for outstanding research in fluid dynamics every four years at the ICTAM conference. Named in honour of George Batchelor, the Australian applied mathematician and fluid dynamicist, the prize has a value of $25,000.

References

 Fons Alkemade (2010) Some of IUTAM's History from IUTAM.

External links
 

Members of the International Council for Science
Scientific organizations established in 1922
International scientific organizations
Mechanical engineering organizations
Members of the International Science Council